European route E 31 (E 31) is a north–south European route, running from Ridderkerk in the Netherlands to Hockenheim in Germany.

The highway is maintained by Rijkswaterstaat.

Route description

History

Exit list

See also

References

External links

031
Motorways in Gelderland
Motorways in Limburg (Netherlands)
Motorways in North Brabant
Motorways in South Holland